Marian Thurm (born 1952) is an American novelist and short-story writer.  Thurm is the author of five short story collections and eight novels, most recently, The Blackmailer’s Guide to Love (Delphinium Books, 2021). Her short stories have appeared in The New Yorker, The Atlantic, Michigan Quarterly Review, Narrative Magazine, The Southampton Review, and many other magazines, and have been included in The Best American Short Stories, and numerous other anthologies. Thurm was raised in Oceanside, Long Island, and has resided in NYC for over 30 years. She is a graduate of Vassar College and has an MA in creative writing from Brown University.

Marian Thurm has taught creative writing at Yale University, Barnard College, Columbia University, the Writing Institute at Sarah Lawrence College, and in the MFA programs at Columbia University and Brooklyn College.

Books
•	The Blackmailer’s Guide to Love (novel) 2021
•	Pleasure Palace; New and Selected Stories (short stories) 2021
•	The Good Life (novel) 2016
•	Today is Not Your Day (short stories) 2015 (New York Times Book Review Editors’ Choice)
•	Slicker (pseudonymous novel by Lucy Jackson) 2010
•	Posh (pseudonymous novel by Lucy Jackson) 2007
•	What’s Come Over You? (short stories) 2001
•	The Clairvoyant (novel) 1997 (New York Times Book Review Notable Book of the Year)
•	The Way We Live Now (novel) 1991
•	Henry in Love (novel) 1990
•	These Things Happen (short stories) 1988 (New York Times Book Review New and Noteworthy)
•	Walking Distance (novel) 1987 (New York Times Book Review New and Noteworthy)
•	Floating (short stories) 1984

Short Stories
"Secrets"-- The New Yorker  January 16, 1978
"Winter"-- The New Yorker  January 1, 1979	 
"Markings"-- The Atlantic Monthly  December 1979 
"California"-- Redbook  November 1980 
"Aftermath"-- Mississippi Review  Spring/Summer 1981 
"Skaters"-- The New Yorker  February 8, 1982					
"Starlight"-- The New Yorker  May 10, 1982 
  Reprinted in:
  Best American Short Stories 1983, edited by Anne Tyler
  American Short Stories of Today, edited by Kenji Kobayashi and Keiko Takeuchi 1986
  American Families, edited by Barbara H. Solomon 1989
  Mothers, 20 Stories of Contemporary Motherhood, edited by Katrina Keninson and Kathleen Hirsch 1996
"Floating"-- The New Yorker  July 26, 1982 
"Uncle Dad"-- Redbook  January 1983  
"Still-Life"-- The New Yorker May 23, 1983
  Reprinted in Legal Fictions: Short Stories about Lawyers and the Law, edited by Jay Wishingrad 1992
"Grace"-- Fiction Network Magazine  Fall 1983 
"Leaving Johanna"-- Mademoiselle  October 1983 
"Lovers"-- The New Yorker  October 3, 1983
"Light-years"-- The Boston Review  January/February 1984
"The North Pole"-- Mademoiselle  December 1984             
“Flying” -- Mississippi Review  No. 42  1985(Distinguished Short Story of the Year, Best American Short Stories 1987)
“Ice”-- Ms. Magazine February 1985 (Reprinted in Editors' Choice—The Best Short Fiction for 1986)
“Perfect Vision”-- Ms. Magazine  March 1986  
“Miss Grace At Her Best”-- Mademoiselle  March 1992                                                                                                                                                                                                                                       
“Moonlight”-- The American Voice No. 42  1997 
“Marquise”-- Ontario Review  No. 50 Spring/Summer 1999	
“Housecleaning”-- Michigan Quarterly Review Fall 2000 
“What Went On”-- Greensboro Review  Fall 2002 
“Sorry”-- Seventeen October 2003 
“Kosta”-- The Southampton Review  Summer 2013 
“Out to Lunch” – Narrative Magazine Winter 2019
“End of Story” – Narrative Magazine Winter 2020
“Banished” – Ascent May 2021

References

1952 births
Living people
20th-century American novelists
American women short story writers
American women novelists
Vassar College alumni
Brown University alumni
20th-century American women writers
20th-century American short story writers
Pseudonymous women writers
20th-century pseudonymous writers
21st-century American women